Garcia is an unincorporated community located in Costilla County, Colorado, United States.  The San Luis post office  serves Garcia postal addresses.

History
Original settled around 1851 as La Plaza de los Manzanares, Garcia rivals San Luis as the oldest continuously occupied settlement in Colorado. A post office called Garcia was established in 1915. The community was named for the local Garcia family.

Geography
Garcia is located at  (37.003375,-105.536728).

References

Unincorporated communities in Costilla County, Colorado
Unincorporated communities in Colorado